Pong Punnakan (30 September 1915 – 28 May 1990) was a Deputy Minister of Transport In the government of Mr. Pott Sarasin, Transport Minister for 4 terms in the government of Field Marshal Thanom Kittikachorn and Field Marshal Sarit Thanarat, former Minister of Industry for 1 term in Field Marshal Thanom Kittikachorn's government and former secretary-general of the Revolutionary Council 1958 Thai coup

History 
Gen. Pong was the son of Captain Luang Phonwinaikit (Ampai Punnakan). Gen. Pong was married to Khun Ying Sa-at (formerly Adireksan), and had a son, Professor Dr. Lueporn. Punnakan and Mee Sak is the grandfather of Phuttiphong Punnakanta and Danupon Punnakanta.

Gen. Pong was appointed as Deputy Minister of Transport. In the government of Mr. Pot Sarasin in 1957 and resigned simultaneously with both the Cabinet after the general election of members of the Thai House of Representatives, December 1957.

He was then re-appointed as the Minister of Transport in the government of Field Marshal Thanom Kittikachorn for three terms and Field Marshal Sarit Thanarat's government.

Gen. Pong joined the 1958 coup in Thailand led by Field Marshal Sarit Thanarat and played a role as the secretary-general of the Revolutionary Council. He was also a member of the executive committee of the Saha Pracha Thai Party, which includes Field Marshal Thanom Kittikachorn, Prime Minister, Minister of Defence and Commander-in-Chief of the Armed Forces be the party leader

Honour 

 1961 -   Knight Grand Cordon of the Most Exalted Order of the White Elephant
 1960 -  Knight Grand Cordon of the Most Noble Order of the Crown of Thailand
 1961 -  Knight Grand Commander of the Most Illustrious Order of Chula Chom Klao
 ??? -  Victory Medal - Indochina
 ??? -  Victory Medal - World War II
 ??? -  Safeguarding the Constitution Medal
 ??? -  Chakra Mala Medal
 1960 -  King Bhumibol Adulyadej's Royal Cypher Medal ,3rd
 ??? -  King Rama IX Coronation Medal

Military rank 

 14 November 1935 - First Lieutenant

References 

1915 births
1990 deaths
Pong Punnakan
Pong Punnakan
Pong Punnakan